Jessup may refer to people real or fictional

People

Canadian
Connor Jessup, Canadian actor, director and producer
Edward Jessup, political figure in Upper Canada, and former British province in what is now Canada
Edward Jessup, Jr., son of Edward Jessup
Edward Jessup III, grandson of Edward Jessup
Hamilton Dibble Jessup, brother of Edward Jessup III

American
Elizabeth Jessup, American computer scientist
Harley Jessup (born 1954), American special effects artist
Joseph Jessup, American professional baseball player
Marion Jessup, American professional tennis player
Morris K. Jessup, American writer on the subject of Unidentified Flying Objects (UFOs)
William Jessup, Pennsylvania judge and notable Republican Party member
Henry Harris Jessup, Presbyterian missionary and son of William Jessup
Philip Jessup, American jurist and International Court of Justice judge between 1961 and 1970
Ted Jessup, American television writer, producer, and performer

Fictional
Nathan Jessup, fictional colonel in the film A Few Good Men
Avery Jessup, fictional character from 30 Rock

Places
Jessup, Indiana, United States
Jessup, Maryland, United States
Jessup, Nevada, United States
Jessup, Pennsylvania, United States

Other uses 

Philip C. Jessup International Law Moot Court Competition
Jessup Correctional Institution
William Jessup University, private Christian institution in Rocklin, California

See also
 Jesup (disambiguation)
 Jessop disambiguation